Haar is a municipality in the district of Munich, in Bavaria, Germany. It is 12 km east of Munich (centre). As of 2017 it had a population of more than 20,000.

It is home to the Haar Disciples, a team in the first division of German's Baseball Bundesliga. In October 2017, the Boards of Appeal of the European Patent Office were relocated to Haar.

References

Munich (district)